Steven Mark Shull (born March 27, 1958) is a retired American football player who played professionally as a linebacker in the National Football League (NFL) for the Miami Dolphins. He played college football at William & Mary. Shull played in 41 regular season NFL games between 1980 and 1982 before a knee injury ended his career. He was named one of the three captains for Super Bowl XVII, which the Dolphins lost to the Washington Redskins 27–17. 

Shull was born in Philadelphia, Pennsylvania and is Jewish.

References

External links
 

1958 births
Living people
American football linebackers
Miami Dolphins players
William & Mary Tribe football players
Sportspeople from Bucks County, Pennsylvania
Players of American football from Philadelphia
Jewish sportspeople